The 1981 Temple Owls football team was an American football team that represented Temple University as an independent during the 1981 NCAA Division I-A football season. In its 12th season under head coach Wayne Hardin, the team compiled a 5–5 record and was outscored by a total of 195 to 181. The team played its home games at Veterans Stadium (two games) and Franklin Field (two games) in Philadelphia. 

The team's statistical leaders included Tink Murphy with 1,589 passing yards, Jim Brown with 883 rushing yards and 66 points scored, and Gerald Lucear with 493 receiving yards.

Schedule

References

Temple
Temple Owls football seasons
Temple Owls football